The Tigard-Tualatin School District (23J) is a school district serving part of the suburban Portland metropolitan area in Oregon including the cities of Tigard, Tualatin, Durham, and King City, as well as the unincorporated communities of Metzger and Bull Mountain.

History
Tigard Elementary School District 23 was established in 1875, while the Tualatin district was started as the Bridgeport district (26J). These districts later merged, as did the Tigard high school district (2J) and the Tualatin high school district (26J).

From its inception until 1992, the district operated only one "senior" high school, Tigard High, which covered grades 10-12. Fowler and Twality Junior High Schools covered grades 7-9. In 1992, a second high school, Tualatin High, was opened, and the district took the opportunity to switch to a middle school system in which the two high schools would cover grades 9-12, the existing junior high schools changed to middle schools covering grades 6-8, and the elementary schools covered grades K-5. A third middle school, Hazelbrook, was also added in 1992.

When Tualatin High opened, new school attendance boundaries were drawn; most students at Twality would attend Tualatin High and most students at Fowler would attend Tigard High. Students living in certain areas were given the option of attending either high school.

Demographics
In the 2009 school year, the district had 170 students classified as homeless by the Department of Education, or 1.3% of students in the district.

Schools

High schools
Tigard High School
Tualatin High School

Middle schools
Fowler Middle School
Hazelbrook Middle School
Twality Middle School

Elementary schools
Deer Creek
Durham
Metzger
Alberta Rider
James Templeton
Charles F. Tigard
Tualatin 
Mary Woodward
Byrom
Bridgeport

Alternative schools
Tigard-Tualatin Online Academy
Creekside Community High School

Partnerships
In the 1980s the district began its relationship with the Portland Japanese School, a weekend Japanese educational program. The Japanese school used Twality Middle School until 1992, when Hazelbrook Middle School opened. The Japanese school is now held at Hazelbrook. Every summer the Japanese school sends some Tigard-Tualatin school employees to Japan so they can study Japanese culture.

See also
List of school districts in Oregon

References

External links
Tigard-Tualatin School District website

School districts in Oregon
Tigard, Oregon
Tualatin, Oregon
Education in Washington County, Oregon
1875 establishments in Oregon